Bela Whipple Jenks (June 6, 1824October 29, 1897) was a Michigan politician.

Early life
Jenks was born on June 6, 1824 in Crown Point, New York.

Career
Jenks was a farmer. On November 3, 1868, Jenks was elected to the Michigan Senate where he represented the 24th district from January 6, 1869 to 1872. In 1881, Jenks was appointed by Governor David Jerome to the Michigan Board of Education where he served until 1888.

Personal life
Jenks married Sarah Carleton on November 3, 1853. Together they had at least four children.

Death
Jenks died due to diabetes on October 29, 1897 in St. Clair, Michigan. Jenks was interred at Hillside Cemetery in St. Clair, Michigan.

References

1824 births
1897 deaths
Farmers from Michigan
Deaths from diabetes
Republican Party Michigan state senators
People from Crown Point, New York
People from St. Clair, Michigan
Burials in Michigan
19th-century American politicians